Soma A power station (formerly Soma power station) is a 44 MW coal-fired power station in Soma, Manisa in western Turkey. The station closed in 2010 but  was reopened in 2012 for research and development by the state owned Electricity Generation Company. It has not yet been permanently closed despite pollution complaints.

Coal
The power station burns lignite from the nearby Soma coal mine.

References

Coal-fired power stations in Turkey